Blithe Spirit is a 2020 British comedy film directed by Edward Hall and starring Dan Stevens, Leslie Mann, Isla Fisher, Judi Dench, Emilia Fox, Julian Rhind-Tutt, Adil Ray, Michele Dotrice, and Aimee-Ffion Edwards. The film was based upon the 1941 play of the same name by Noël Coward, adapted for the screen by Nick Moorcroft, Meg Leonard, and Piers Ashworth.

Blithe Spirit had its world premiere at the 2020 Mill Valley Film Festival, and was released in the United Kingdom on 15 January 2021. The film received generally negative reviews from critics.

Plot summary
Successful playwright Charles Condomine is suffering from depression and writer's block. After a performance by popular medium Madame Arcati ends in fiasco, as a kind of publicity act, the medium performs a private séance at Charles's home and accidentally summons the spirit of Elvira, his deceased first wife.

Conflict follows as Elvira becomes jealous of Ruth, Charles's new wife, and attempts to drive her away. Charles now has to balance between the two women, and protect Ruth from Elvira as he is the only one who can actually see her.

Cast

Production
In May 2019, it was announced Dan Stevens, Isla Fisher, and Judi Dench had joined the cast of the film, with Edward Hall directing from a screenplay by Piers Ashworth, Meg Leonard and Nick Moorcroft. In June 2019, Leslie Mann, Julian Rhind-Tutt, Emilia Fox, Dave Johns and James Fleet joined the cast of the film.

Principal photography began near Sydney in June 2019.

Release
The film premiered on 8 October 2020 at the Mill Valley Film Festival, and was screened later in the same month at the San Diego International Film Festival. The film was scheduled to be released in the United Kingdom on 1 May 2020, but was delayed to 4 September 2020 because of the COVID-19 pandemic. It was then further delayed to 25 December 2020. In November 2020, Sky acquired the British distribution rights, and the film was released on the Sky Cinema channel on 15 January 2021. IFC Films distributed the film in the United States.

Home media
Blithe Spirit was released on DVD and Blu-Ray on 26 April 2021 by Warner Bros. Home Entertainment under Universal Pictures Home Entertainment, which includes interviews from the cast and additional bonus features. The movie was released and distributed in the Nordic countries as My Better Halves.

Reception

Box office
In its opening weekend in the United States, the film grossed $98,100 from 239 theaters. It was also the most-rented title on the Apple TV's indie movie chart, and ninth overall.

Critical response
The website's critics consensus reads: "An indifferent adaptation of classic source material, Blithe Spirit puts a star-studded cast through the motions without capturing the story's screwball spark." According to Metacritic, which sampled 16 critics and calculated a weighted average score of 26 out of 100, the film received "generally unfavorable reviews".

See also
 Blithe Spirit (1945 film)

References

External links
 
 

2020 comedy films
2020 films
British fantasy comedy films
British films based on plays
British ghost films
Films postponed due to the COVID-19 pandemic
Films set in 1937
Films set in England
IFC Films films
StudioCanal films
2020 directorial debut films
2020s English-language films
2020s British films
2020s French films